Daniel Wilkinson (c. 1845 – November 21, 1885) was the last person to be executed by Maine. He was hanged for the murder of a police officer after a burglary in Bath, Maine.

In the early morning hours of September 4, 1883, Wilkinson and his accomplice John Ewitt were caught attempting to break into the D.C. Gould Ship Chandlery and Provision Store in Bath. As Wilkinson and Ewitt were running away from one police officer, they collided with Constable William Lawrence. Wilkinson immediately shot Lawrence in the head with a .32 caliber revolver.

Wilkinson was arrested in Bangor, Maine less than a week after the incident and was charged with murder on September 11, 1883. It was discovered that Wilkinson was an escapee from the Maine State Prison. Ewitt had travelled to England; his extradition was never sought by Maine. Wilkinson's trial began in the Bath Superior Court on January 4, 1884. He was convicted by the jury of first degree murder on January 7, 1884, and was sentenced by the judge to death by hanging.

The death sentence was carried out at the Maine State Prison in Thomaston on November 21, 1885. Wilkinson did not die instantly from the hanging but slowly died of strangulation. The nature of Wilkinson's death, which was similar to the executions of two other inmates the previous April, was used by anti-death penalty activists to argue that Maine should abolish the death penalty, which it did in 1887.

See also 
 Capital punishment in Maine
 List of most recent executions by jurisdiction

References 

 Dick Dooley, series of articles in Rockland Courier-Gazette, 1974-08-15, 1974-08-22, 1974-08-29
 Edward Schriver, "Reluctant Hangman: The State of Maine and Capital Punishment, 1820-1887", New England Quarterly, vol. 63, no. 2 (Jun. 1990) pp. 271–287

External links 
 City of Bath: "Fallen Officer"

1845 births
1885 deaths
1883 murders in the United States
19th-century executions by the United States
American people executed for murdering police officers
19th-century executions of American people
American escapees
Escapees from Maine detention
People executed by Maine by hanging
People convicted of murder by Maine
Deaths by strangulation in the United States
People from Sagadahoc County, Maine